No. 665 "Air Observation Post" Squadron, RCAF was formed in England during the Second World War. It was manned principally by Royal Canadian Artillery (RCA) and Royal Canadian Air Force (RCAF) personnel, with select British artillery pilots briefly seconded to assist in squadron formation. Numbers 651 to 663 Squadrons of the RAF were Air Observation Post units working closely with Army units in artillery spotting and liaison. A further three of these squadrons – Nos. 664, 665 and 666 – were RCAF AOP squadrons manned by Canadian and British personnel.

History

Formation

The squadron was formed on 22 January 1945 at RAF Andover as an RCAF unit – albeit not in the 'Article XI' sequence of squadron numbers, but in a 'normal' British sequence – its principal role being to direct artillery fire from the air. The pilots were officers recruited from the Royal Canadian Artillery and trained to fly at 22 E.F.T.S. (Elementary Flying Training School)  Cambridge, further developing advanced flying skills at No. 43 Operational Training Unit RAF (43 OTU), RAF Andover. The first commanding officer was Major Dave Ely, RCA. The operational commanding officer selected to take the squadron to war was Captain G.A. 'Tony' Eaton, MC, RCA; Eaton was killed in a flying mishap near RAF Middle Wallop on the night of 1 March 1945. Major Norbert Reilander, RCA, from No. 664 Squadron RCAF, was chosen to take command of 665 Squadron in the first week of March 1945. The squadron operated in England under the overall control of No. 70 Group, RAF Fighter Command; prior to deployment to the European continent the squadron was transferred to No. 84 Group, RAF Second Tactical Air Force (2 TAF).

On operations
The squadron began deploying to the Netherlands on 19 April, arriving at B-77 Gilze-Rijen airport on 21 April 1945. The principal aircraft flown in action was the Taylorcraft Auster Mk.V. 'B' Flight of 665 (AOP) Squadron, RCAF, was credited with firing the last Canadian shot of the war in Europe at Dunkirk, France, on 7 May 1945. After V-E Day on 8 May 1945, the squadron was tasked with flying mail and passengers for First Canadian Army, while one section and its aircraft was seconded to Allied Headquarters at Frankfurt, Germany, for U.S. Intelligence duties. 
No. 665 (AOP) Squadron, RCAF, was disbanded at 'JOE' airfield, Apeldoorn, the Netherlands, on 10 July 1945. The squadron had no official motto or heraldic badge assigned to it.

Aircrew or not?
Formation of the three Canadian war-time AOP squadrons was historically the first example of 'unification of services,' a generation before the Canadian Forces experienced total unification. These, however, were not 'co-operation squadrons.' Although 665 squadron's trained aircrew observers acquitted themselves admirably in aerial action against the enemy, aircrew associations across Canada did not grant membership to AOP observers, as those aircrew were not officially issued with cloth wings during the war.

References

Notes

Bibliography

 Library and Archives Canada – Reel #C12430. War Diary of 665(AOP)(RCAF) Squadron.
 Blackburn, George. Where The Hell are the Guns?, Toronto, Canada: McClelland & Stewart Publishing, 1997. .
 Bowyer, Michael J.F. and John D.R. Rawlings. Squadron Codes, 1937–56. Cambridge, UK: Patrick Stephens Ltd., 1979. .
 Delve, Ken. The Source Book of the RAF. Shrewsbury, Shropshire, UK: Airlife Publishing, 1994. .
 Flintham, Vic and Andrew Thomas. Combat Codes: A full explanation and listing of British, Commonwealth and Allied air force unit codes since 1938. Shrewsbury, Shropshire, UK: Airlife Publishing Ltd., 2003. .
 Fromow, Lt-Col. D.L. Canada's Flying Gunners: A History of the Air Observation Post of the Royal Regiment of Canadian Artillery. Ottawa, Canada: Air Observation Post Pilots Association, 2002. .
 Halley, James J. The Squadrons of the Royal Air Force & Commonwealth 1918–1988. Tonbridge, Kent, UK: Air Britain (Historians) Ltd., 1988. .
 Jefford, C.G. RAF Squadrons, a Comprehensive record of the Movement and Equipment of all RAF Squadrons and their Antecedents since 1912. Shropshire, UK: Airlife Publishing, 1988 (second edition 2001). .
 Knight, Darrell. Artillery Flyers at War: A History of the 664, 665, and 666 ‘Air Observation Post’ Squadrons of the Royal Canadian Air Force. Bennington, Vermont, USA: Merriam Press, 2010. .
 Stewart, Major A.B. Battle History 666. Epe, the Netherlands, 1945. Republished by Abel Book Company, Calgary, 2006.

External links
 Canadian Forces Directorate of History and Heritage
 Toronto Aircrew Association
 Histories for No.'s 651–670 Squadrons on RAF Web

Royal Canadian Air Force squadrons (disbanded)
Military units and formations established in 1945
Military units and formations of the Royal Air Force in World War II
665 Squadron
Military units and formations of Canada in World War II